Arta (Greek:  , ΑΡΤΑΥΟΥ Artauou (epigraphic); Kharoshthi:) was the elder brother of the well known Gandhara ruler  Maues or Moga.

Name
Arta's name is attested in the Greek form  and in the Kharosthi form , which are derived from the Saka name , meaning "pious".

Scholarly view
Kharahostes’s own coins attest that Kshatrapa Kharaostes was the son of Arta:

Kshatrapasa pra Kharaostasa Artasa putrasa (i.e. Kshatrapa Kharaosta, son of Arta).

Some of Kharaosta's known coins write Ortas instead of Artas.

Scholars state that Yuvaraja Kharaosta Kamuio of the Lion Capital Inscriptions is the same as Kshatrapa Kharaosta, whose coins have been studied by Dr Rapson and Dr Luders. It is now generally agreed that Kshatrapa Kharaosta was son Arta, and that Yuvaraja Kharaosta and Kshatrapa Kharaosta were one and same historical personage.

The Inscriptions A and E on the Mathura Lion Capital style Kharaosta as Yuvaraya Kharaosta Kamuio.  

Based on the estimates of the relative ages of various personages portrayed in Lion Capital Inscriptions, Dr Stein Konow has determined that Yuvaraja Kharaosta Kamuio (i.e. son of Arta) was the father of Aiyasi Kamuia, the chief queen (Agra-Mahisi) of Saka Mahakshatrapa Rajuvula.
See also:  .

An older view was that Arta, the father of Kharaosta, was the first husband of Rajuvula's chief queen who had married Rajuvula after Arta's death. However, Dr S Konow does not accept this view. The fact that last name Kamuia  has been used both by Yuvaraja Kharaosta as well as by princess Aiyasi clearly proves that Aiyasi Kamuia was the daughter and not mother of Yuvaraja Kharaosta Kamuio, since it is the father's  and not mother's lineage which is adopted by their off-springs.

It appears that Arta had died before the date of writing of the Mathura Lion Capital inscriptions.

Yuvaraja Kharaosta Kamuio, therefore, was the legitimate inheritor to the position as King of Kings for the kingdom of Gandhara after king Moga.

Saka governor Rajuvula had married princess Aiyasi Kamuia, daughter of Yuvaraja Kharaosta Kamuio, probably to strengthen his political position and also his claim to the throne (of Taxila).

This prospect was obviously not liked by other Saka chiefs. This appears to be the reason as to why the title of Shahanshahi was discontinued and only the titles of Kshatrapa and Mahakshtarpa obtained among the Sakas from that time onwards. These Sakas later organized a Samgha under Rajuvula and Patika when Rajuvula assumed the title of Maha-Ksatrapa for the first time.

It appears, for some reasons, that Yuvaraja Kharaosta Kamuio did not avail the position of King of Kings after Moga's death.

Many scholars including Sten Konow, H. W. Bailey, R. K. Mukerjee, K. P. Jaiswal, J. L. Kamboj, Buddha Prakash and others recognise that the names Kamuia and Kamuio (q.v) of the Mathura Lion Capital Inscriptions are the Kharoshthi/Prakritic forms of Sanskrit/Pali Kambojika or Kamboja.

Hence according to one school of scholars, king Maues, his brother Arta, Kharaosta Kamuio and Kharaosta's daughter Aiyasi Kamuia --- all belonged to the Kambojika or Kamboja clan or lineage.

Mahaksatrapa Arta of the Inscribed Silver Buddhist Reliquary 

A recently discovered "Inscribed Silver Buddhist Reliquary", found from Shinkot in Bajaur (Pakistan), and edited and published for the first time by Richard Saloman, in Journal of the American Oriental Society (July- September 1996), refers to a king named Kharayosta, believed to belong to the later quarter of first century BCE. According to its editor Dr Richard Salomon (University of Washington), king Kharayosta of the "Inscribed Silver Buddhist Reliquary", in all probability, is the same Kharaosta who finds reference as Yuvaraja Kharosta in the Mathura Lion Capital inscriptions as well as, as Kharaostasa or Kharahostes in the coins.

Notes

External links 
 Mathura Lion Capital Inscriptions  
 The Early Kushan Kings: New Evidence for Chronology: Para (63)

See also 
Kamuia
Aiyasi Kamuia
Kharaosta Kamuio
Maues
Kambojas
Kamboja
Parama-Kambojas
Rishikas

References 
Corpus Inscriptionum Indicarum, Vol II, part I, Dr Stein Konow
Journal of Bihar and Orissa Research society, Vol XVI, 1930, parts III, IV, Dr K. P. Jayswal
Ancient India, 1956, Dr R. K. Mukerjee
Comprehensive History of India, 1957, Vol II, Dr K. A. Nilkantha Shastri
Ancient Kamboja People & Country, 1981, Dr J. L. Kamboj
Political History of ancient India, 1996,  Dr H. C. raychaudhury
India and the World,  1964, Dr Buddha Parkash
India and Central Asia, 1929, Dr P. C. Bagchi
Sculptures of Mathura and Sarnath, 2002, Usha Rani Tiwari (br)
The Sakas in India, Dr S. Chattopadhyaya
The development of Kharoshthi Script, Dr C. C. Dasgupta
Hellenism in Ancient India, G. N. Bannerjee
Journal of Bihar and Orissa Research Society, Vol Xvi Parts III, IV, 1930.
An Inscribed Silver Buddhist Reliquary of the Time of King Kharaosta and Prince Indravarman, Journal of the American Oriental Society, Vol. 116, No. 3 (Jul. - Sep., 1996), Richard Salomon

Indo-Scythian peoples